Takaomyia flavofasciata is a species of Hoverfly in the family Syrphidae.

Distribution
China.

References

Eristalinae
Insects described in 2017
Diptera of Asia